The 2022 Toray Pan Pacific Open was a professional women's tennis tournament played on outdoor hard courts. It was the 37th edition of the Pan Pacific Open, and part of the WTA 500 tournaments of the 2022 WTA Tour. It took place at the Ariake Coliseum in Tokyo, Japan. It was the first event since 2019, with the 2020 and 2021 events cancelled due to the COVID-19 pandemic.

Champions

Singles

  Liudmila Samsonova def.  Zheng Qinwen 7–5, 7–5

This is Samsonova's third singles title of the season and fourth of her career.

Doubles

  Gabriela Dabrowski /  Giuliana Olmos def.  Nicole Melichar-Martinez /  Ellen Perez 6–4, 6–4

Points and prize money

Point distribution

Singles main draw entrants

Seeds

 Rankings are as of September 12, 2022

Other entrants
The following players received wild cards into the main singles draw:
  Mai Hontama
  Yuki Naito
  Elena Rybakina

The following player used a protected ranking to enter the main draw:
  Sofia Kenin

The following players received entry from the singles qualifying draw:
  Fernanda Contreras Gómez
  Despina Papamichail
  Ellen Perez
  Rina Saigo
  Isabella Shinikova
  You Xiaodi

Withdrawals
Before the tournament
  Sorana Cîrstea → replaced by  Daria Saville
  Daria Kasatkina → replaced by  Wang Xinyu
  Yulia Putintseva → replaced by  Wang Qiang
  Aryna Sabalenka → replaced by  Claire Liu

During the tournament 
  Naomi Osaka (abdominal pain)

Retirements
  Daria Saville (torn ACL)

Doubles main draw entrants

Seeds

 Rankings are as of September 12, 2022

Other entrants 
The following pair received a wildcard into the doubles main draw:
  Misaki Doi /  Kurumi Nara

The following pair received entry as alternates:
  Mai Hontama /  Yuki Naito

Withdrawals
Before the tournament
  Beatriz Haddad Maia /  Zhang Shuai → replaced by  Mai Hontama /  Yuki Naito
  Xu Yifan /  Yang Zhaoxuan → replaced by  Miyu Kato /  Wang Xinyu

References

External links 
 

2022 WTA Tour
2022
2022 in Japanese sport
Toray Pan Pacific Open